Amerila niveivitrea is a moth of the subfamily Arctiinae. It was described by Max Bartel in 1903. It is found in Angola, Benin, Burkina Faso, Cameroon, the Democratic Republic of the Congo, Ethiopia, Ghana, Ivory Coast, Kenya, Mali, Nigeria, Tanzania, Togo and Uganda.

The length of the forewings is 26–29 mm.

References 

  (1903). "Neue aetiopische Arctiidae der Sammlung des Kgl. Museums für Naturkunde in Berlin". Deutsche Entomologische Zeitschrift Iris. 16: 170-214.
  (1997). "A revision of the Afrotropical taxa of the genus Amerila Walker (Lepidoptera, Arctiidae)". Systematic Entomology. 22 (1): 1-44.

Moths described in 1903
Amerilini
Moths of Africa